Megalopyge lacyi is a moth of the family Megalopygidae. It was described by William Barnes and James Halliday McDunnough in 1910.

References

Moths described in 1910
Megalopygidae